Hirai  may refer to:

Places 
 Hirai Edogawa, Tokyo, Japan
 Hirai Station (Tokyo)

People with the surname
Hisashi Hirai (born 1959)
Kanako Hirai (born 1984)
Kazuo Hirai (born 1960), CEO Sony Corporation
Kazumasa Hirai (author) (1938–2015), author
Kazumasa Hirai (weightlifter) (born 1949), weightlifter
Ken Hirai (born 1972)
Kōzaburō Hirai, (1910–2002) Japanese composer 
Minoru Hirai (1903–1998)
Naohito Hirai (born 1978)
Nobukazu Hirai (born 1969)
Hirai Seijirō (1856–1926), railroad engineer
Shinji Hirai (born 1961)
Shoki Hirai (born 1987)
Takuya Hirai (born 1958)
Tarō Hirai (1894–1965), Japanese author, better known by the pen name Edogawa Ranpo
Terushichi Hirai (1900–1970)
Momo Hirai (born 1996), K-pop Idol from Twice
Kawato Hirai (born 1997), Japanese professional wrestler (NJPW)
, Japanese swimmer

Japanese-language surnames